Arhopala asopia, the plain tailless oakblue,  is a butterfly in the family Lycaenidae. It was described by William Chapman Hewitson in 1869. It is found in the Indomalayan realm (Manipur, Assam, Burma, Thailand, and Laos).

References

External links
Arhopala Boisduval, 1832 at Markku Savela's Lepidoptera and Some Other Life Forms. Retrieved June 3, 2017.

Arhopala
Butterflies described in 1869